The Athens of Texas is a nickname that has been coined to describe several cities in Texas including:

Marshall, Texas
Sherman, Texas
Waco, Texas

See also
 Athens, Texas, a city in Northeast Texas